Pedro Vitor may refer to:

 Pedro Vitor (footballer, born February 1998), full name Pedro Vitor de Sousa Neto Silva, Brazilian football midfielder
 Pedro Vitor (footballer, born March 1998), full name Pedro Vitor Ferreira da Silva, Brazilian football midfielder